Brewn' began as a duo performing a mix of country rock and country covers in Canberra, Australia. Original members Mick and Scott attended the 2010 Tamworth Country Music Festival as buskers. During the annual festival, the partnership met other members of the industry who encouraged them to develop their original works further.

The band went through multiple members before settling on their current line up in 2021, which consists of Michael Bond, James Cox, John Barbara and Anthony Barbara.

History

Bear Country Road & Rusted On
Their debut EP, Bear Country Road, was launched in June 2010 and featured five original songs, including their debut single "Lazy".

Brewn's debut album Rusted On was launched at the 2011 Tamworth Country Music Festival. The debut single off the album, "Heaven", was also launched with a 3D video clip at the Tamworth cinema. The clip was shot and produced entirely in Tamworth.

My Town
"My Town", the title track and first single released from their second album was recorded and produced by Robert Mackay at Pacific International Music Australia in Hervey Bay and mixed and mastered by Jason Millhouse. The video clip was directed by Duncan Toombs (Filmery).

Collaboration with James Blundell
In 2018, Brewn was invited to support longtime friend and musical collaborator James Blundell during the production of his 30th anniversary album James Blundell 30 Years of Pride . The album consisted of well known Australian Country Music artists recording their versions of Blundell's songs. Artists included Tania Kernaghan , Adam Brand and Cameron Daddo. Brewn provided the backing instrumentals for all tracks, and contributed their version of Down on the Farm.

Discography

Albums

Extended plays

Awards 
2010 - Best Country Rock Song - Lazy - Federation Song Writing Awards.

2010 - Best Extended Play album - Bear Country Road - Canberra Regional Country Music Awards

2010 - Best Production (Engineer/Arrangement) - Bear Country Road - Canberra Regional Country Music Awards.

References

External links 

 Official band website

Australian Capital Territory musical groups